The Otto Hahn Medal is awarded by the Max Planck Society to young scientists and researchers in both the natural and social sciences. The award takes its name from the German chemist and Nobel Prize laureate Otto Hahn, who served as the first president of the Max Planck Society from 1948 to 1960.

The medal is awarded annually to a maximum of thirty junior scientists in recognition of outstanding scientific achievement. Up to ten awardees are selected in each of three thematized sections: 1) Biological-Medical, 2) Chemical-Physical-Engineering, and 3) Social Science-Humanities. It is accompanied by a monetary award of €7,500. Medalists are awarded during a ceremony at the General Meeting of the Max Planck Society, taking place annually in alternating locales in Germany.

Notable awardees
Ralf Adams, biochemist
Susanne Albers, computer scientist, 2008 Leibniz Prize winner

Niko Beerenwinkel, mathematician
Martin Beneke, theoretical physicist, 2008 Leibniz Prize winner
Immanuel Bloch, experimental physicist, 2004 Leibniz Prize winner
Guido Bünstorf, economist
Demetrios Christodoulou, mathematician, 1993 MacArthur Fellow
Bianca Dittrich, theoretical physicist
Reinhard Genzel, astrophysicist, 2020 Nobel Prize winner
Daniel Goldstein, cognitive psychologist
Christiane Koch, physicist, 2002
Juliane Kokott, Advocate General at the Court of Justice of the European Union
Maxim Kontsevich, mathematician, 1998 Fields Medalist
Rainer Mauersberger, astronomer
Tomaso Poggio, neuroscientist
Tilman Schirmer, structural biologist
Wolfgang P. Schleich, theoretical physicist, 1995 Leibniz Prize winner
Tania Singer, neuroscientist
Matthias Steinmetz, astronomer, 1998 Packard Fellow
Friedrich-Karl Thielemann, astrophysicist
Dietmar Vestweber, biochemist, 1998 Leibniz Prize winner
Viola Vogel, bioengineer
Julia Vorholt, microbiologist

See also
 Otto Hahn Prize
 Otto Hahn Peace Medal
 List of general science and technology awards 
 List of chemistry awards
 List of awards named after people
 List of early career awards

References

German science and technology awards
Early career awards
Academic awards
Otto Hahn
Max Planck Society
Awards established in 1978
1978 establishments in Germany